John Mahon (1901 – 1975) was a British communist political activist.

The son of socialist leader John Lincoln Mahon, John Mahon was born in Dublin, but grew up in London.  He was educated at St Olave's and St Saviour's Grammar School before finding employment at an engineering works.

Mahon was a founder member of the Communist Party of Great Britain (CPGB), and soon became a full-time worker for the party, achieving prominence in the party's National Minority Movement.  Within this, he was known for his antipathy towards the existing trade union movement, taking one of the most hardline views of the party's "class against class" policy.  By the start of the 1930s, the movement was winding down, but Mahon was appointed as editor of its newspaper, The Worker.  He served as the election agent for party leader Harry Pollitt's unsuccessful campaign in the 1930 Whitechapel and St Georges by-election, then in 1931 was appointed as the CPGB's representative to the Profintern.  In this role, he visited Moscow, attending a meeting of the Executive Committee of the Communist International.  Meanwhile, matters came to a head over his political views after party theoretician Rajani Palme Dutt wrote in support of Mahon, but Pollitt was able to manoeuvre the party into dissolving the Minority Movement and refocusing on work in the existing trade unions.

With the Minority Movement no longer in existence, Mahon found a role as Industrial Organiser for the London District of the CPGB.  In 1937, he served as Political Commissar for the British Battalion in the Spanish Civil War, but soon returned to London.  In 1947, he replaced Ted Bramley as District Secretary, and was also elected to the party's Executive Committee for the first time.  He stood unsuccessfully for election on three occasions: in the 1949 St Pancras North by-election, in Battersea North at the 1950 general election, and in Lewisham South in 1951.

Mahon retired from his party posts in 1966, and was replaced as District Secretary by Frank Stanley.  He spent his retirement writing a biography of Pollitt, which was published in 1974, dying shortly afterwards.

References

1901 births
1975 deaths
British people of the Spanish Civil War
Communist Party of Great Britain members
Politicians from Dublin (city)